Karauli State was a princely state in India from 1348 to 1949. It is located in the Braj region. Karauli city was the capital while Mandrayal or Mandrail was another important town.

Geography
In 1901, the population of the state was 156,786, and that of the town was 23,482. Millets, the staple food of the people, was the main agricultural produce. As of the early 20th century, there were no major industries; a little weaving, dyeing, wood-turning, and stone cutting constituted the notable cottage industries. Most goods, as also salt, sugar, cotton, buffaloes, and bullocks, were imported; rice and goats comprised the main exports.

History
Historically, Karauli was ruled by a maharaja, who was also the head of the Jadon clan of Rajputs and claimed descent from the deity Krishna. Around 1058, Tahan Pāl built a fort at Tahangarh, and was known to possess almost the entirety of what would later be called Karauli State as well as surrounding territory. 

In 1196, his descendant Kunwar Pāl lost all of his territory to the invading Ghurid Dynasty. The territory was not recovered until approximately 1327, when Arjun Pāl re-conquered much of this land and founded the town of Karauli. The Jadons remained independent for a century until their lands were once again captured, this time by Mahmud I of Malwa. The Jadons remained insignificant until Gopāl Dās gained the favor of Akbar, the third Mughal emperor. Sometime during his reign from 1556–1605, Akbar named Dās the Maharaja of Karauli.

Alliance with the British 
On 9 November 1817, Karauli became the first state to conclude the treaty with the British Empire. Through an agent in Delhi, its maharaja Harbaksh Pal Deo assented to becoming a protectorate state.

In 1857, during the Indian Rebellion of 1857, Maharaja Madan Pal supported the British Raj. He concealed English troops from Indian rebels within Karauli or spirited them out of state. He also sent approximately 2300 of his own troops to fight against the rebels, securing the Karauli palace until British reinforcements arrived. For his loyalty to the British Empire, Madan Pal was made a Grand Commander of the Order of the Star of India. The salute of honour, to which the Chiefs of Karauli were entitled, was also enhanced from 15 to 17 in appreciation of the loyal services of Raja Madan Pal, who was also decorated with a rich dress of honour.

The state under Maharaja Ganesh Pal Deo acceded to the Dominion of India on 4 August 1947. Karauli later merged with the Union of India and became part of the state of Rajasthan.

List of Maharajas 

1691 – 1734: Kanwar Pal II 
1734 – 1757: Gopal Singh (d. 1757) 
1757 – 24 Oct 1772: Tarsam Pal (d. 1772)
1772 – 1804: Manak Pal (d. 1804)
1804 – 1805: Amola Pal (d. 1805) 
1805 – 1837: Herbaksh Pal (b.  1792 – d. 1837) 
1837 – 1849: Pratap Pal (d. 1849)
1849 – 10 Jul 1852:Narsingh Pal (d. 1852) 
4 Sep 1852 – 14 Mar 1854: Bharat Pal 
14 Mar 1854 – 16 Aug 1869: Madan Pal (d. 1869) (from 12 Feb 1866, Sir Madan Pal)
1869: Lakshman Pal 
1869 – 17 Nov 1875: Jaisingh Pal (d. 1875) 
1869 – 1871: Vrishbhan Singh Tanwar – Regent
Jan 1876 – 14 Aug 1886: Arjun Pal II (d. 1886) 
14 Aug 1886 –  3 Aug 1927: Bhanwar Pal (b. 1864 – d. 1927)  (from 22 Jun 1897, Sir Bhanwar Pal)
 3 Aug 1927 –  6 Apr 1947: Bhom Pal (b. 1866 – d. 1947) (from 1 Jan 1935, Sir Bhom Pal)
 6 Apr 1940 – 15 Aug 1947: Ganesh Pal (b. 1905 – d. 1984)

See also

Political integration of India
Rajputana Agency

References

External links
Revenue Stamps of the Princely State of Karauli Exhibit by Jiří Černý

Rajputana Agency
Rajputs
1348 establishments in Asia
14th-century establishments in India
1949 disestablishments in India